Mike Tyson vs. Alex Stewart, billed as The Hard Way Back, was a professional boxing match contested on December 8, 1990.

Background
On February 11, 1990, Mike Tyson endured an upset loss to James "Buster" Douglas that cost him the undisputed Heavyweight Championship. Though he had hoped for a rematch, Douglas instead opted to face the number one contender, Evander Holyfield. As such, Tyson was forced to go down the comeback trail. His first opponent was 1984 Olympic Gold Medalist Henry Tillman, who had twice defeated Tyson as an amateur. Tyson easily defeated Tillman, knocking him out at 2:47 in the first round. Tyson's next fight in his comeback was against Alex Stewart, an up-and-coming prospect with all 26 of his wins as a professional coming by way of knockout. He was undefeated through his first 24 fights before falling to a rising Evander Holyfield. Nevertheless, Stewart came into the fight with Tyson with a 26–1 record and was taken as a more serious opponent for Tyson than the struggling Tillman. Though the fight was originally set for September 22, Tyson suffered a deep cut over his right eye due to an accidental headbutt from sparring partner Greg Page. The cut required 48 stitches, causing the fight to be rescheduled for December 8.

The fight
As soon as the match started, Tyson went on the attack and hit Stewart with two right hands, the second of which knocked Stewart to the canvas less than 10 seconds into the fight. Stewart was able to get back up at the count of five and continue the fight, but he was met with a bevy of power punches from Tyson. At 1:05 in the round, Stewart was again knocked down by a right hand from Tyson. This time he got up at the count of eight and referee Frank Cappuccino allowed Stewart to continue. With the three knockdown rule in effect, Tyson would continue his furious assault on Stewart in an effort to get the third knockdown which would give him the automatic victory. At 2:27 in the round, Tyson hit Stewart with a short left hand the knocked Stewart down for the third time, ending the fight and giving Tyson the victory by technical knockout.

Aftermath
Tyson, who at the time was the number one contender, would then agree to fight the dangerous number two contender, Donovan "Razor" Ruddock, with the winner of the fight earning the right to face Holyfield for the Undisputed Heavyweight Championship. Tyson would controversially pick up the victory via 7th round technical knockout after referee Richard Steele stopped the fight despite the fact that Ruddock appeared healthy enough to continue. Because of this, Tyson and Ruddock's camps agreed to a rematch three months later. Tyson would again earn the victory, this time by unanimous decision, but before his planned match with Holyfield could happen, he was charged and subsequently sentenced to six years in prison for rape.

Undercard
Donovan "Razor" Ruddock knocked out Mike Rouse in Round 1.

References

1990 in boxing
1990 in sports in New Jersey
Stewart
December 1990 sports events in the United States
Boxing matches at Boardwalk Hall